= Angel Bix =

English Franciscan friar

- Died: 1695
- Occupation: Franciscan friar

Angel Bix (died 1695) was an English Franciscan friar.

== Biography ==
Bix, after filling the office of confessor to the Poor Clares at Aire, and to the community at Princenhoff, Bruges, was sent to England, and became chaplain to the Spanish ambassador in London in the reign of James II. He died early in 1695 whilst guardian of his order at York. Bix preached "A Sermon on the Passion of our Lord and Saviour Jesus Christ. Preach'd before her majesty the queen-dowager in her chapel at Somerset House, upon Good Friday, 13 April 1688;" published by royal authority, London, 1688, 4to, and reprinted in "A Select Collection of Catholick Sermons," 2 vols., London, 1741.
